{{DISPLAYTITLE:Rho2 Arietis}}

Rho2 Arietis is an M-type red giant star in the northern constellation of Aries. With an annual parallax shift of 9.28 mas, it is approximately  distant from the Earth.

Rho2 Arietis is classified as a semiregular variable star with periods of 49.9 and 54.8 days. It varies in visual magnitude between 5.45 and 6.01. It has the variable star designation, RZ Arietis. It is generally considered to be an asymptotic giant branch star, having exhausted its core helium.

References

Arietis, 45
Arietis, Rho02
013654
018191
M-type giants
Aries (constellation)
Semiregular variable stars
0867
Durchmusterung objects
Arietis, RZ